The South First Street Bridge (sometimes simply the First Street Bridge) is a bridge in Austin, Texas, United States.

References

Bridges in Austin, Texas